Pichaqani (Aymara pichaqa, phichaqa, piqacha a big needle, -ni a suffix, "the one with a big needle", also spelled Pichacani) is a  mountain in the Andes of Bolivia. It is located in the Oruro Department, Sajama Province, Turco Municipality. Pichaqani lies at the northern bank of the Pumiri River.

References 

Mountains of Oruro Department